A World for Julius (original title: Un Mundo para Julius, 1970), is the first novel published by the Peruvian writer Alfredo Bryce. In this postmodern novel, Bryce incisively charts the decline of an influential, centuries-old aristocratic family faced with the invasion of foreign capital in the 1950s.

The protagonist, Julius, is the youngest child of a wealthy Peruvian family. He studied at Inmaculado Corazón school and Markham College.

The novel was adapted into an internationally co-produced film of the same name written and directed by Rossana Díaz Costa.

1970 novels
Spanish-language books
Peruvian novels
Novels set in Lima
Peruvian novels adapted into films
Seix Barral books
Revolutionary Government of the Armed Forces of Peru